The AIA Philippines Life and General Insurance Company Inc. (commonly known by its trade name AIA Philippines and formerly known as the Philippine American Life and General Insurance Company or Philam Life) is an insurance company based in the Philippines. The company in 2020, came among the largest life insurance companies based on asset and net worth.

History 

AIA Philippines was founded in 1947 as Philam Life by Cornelius Vander Starr, the founder of AIG, and his partner Earl Carroll.

The company has received various awards such as the Asian Management Award for General Management, Asian Management Award for Financial Management, and the Reader's Digest Platinum Trusted Brand Award. In addition, it also received the Presidential Citation from the Philippine government in 1994.

In 1961, the company inaugurated its office the Philam Life Building in Ermita. The building soon became a landmark structure as well as being a center of culture and the arts in Manila. The building would serve as its headquarters until 2013, when the company moved its headquarters to the Bonifacio Global City in Taguig.

Philam Life was part of the AIG until 2009 when the company, along with other AIG subsidiaries, American International Assurance (AIA) and ALICO were placed under the administration of a special purpose vehicle in exchange for a bailout by the Federal Reserve Bank of New York. On November 3, 2009, the American International Assurance (AIA Group) bought 99.78% stake of Philamlife after approval of government regulators. On November 27, 2009, the new Philamlife bought a 51% stake in Ayala Life and formed a joint venture with the Bank of the Philippine Islands (BPI). Ayala Life was renamed BPI-Philam Life Assurance Corporation (BPI-Philam) in 2010. As a member of the AIA group, Philam Life has become AIA's Top Performing Company out of 17 countries in the AIA Group, having won the AIA Champion's League Gold Cup and the Premier League Champion Cup in 2013.

On August 9, 2021, Philam Life officially changed its name to AIA Philippines.

Office Buildings

Manila Office 
The Philam Life Building in Manila was the former headquarters of the company. Designed by Carlos Arguelles, the building was one of the first structures built in the international style of architecture. It was completed in 1961.

Architecture 
From that initial project, the Philamlife Corporation gave Arguelles his first big office-building commission — the Philamlife headquarters. This he shaped into one of the first international-style buildings in Manila. The medium-rise block was a rectangularly-planned structure with a centralized core that allowed some 20,000 square meters of office space to be naturally daylighted through the use of wraparound ribbon window glazing and aluminium sunshades supported by pipes and millions. Sculpted concrete formed entrance canopies and a roof for the complex's auditorium. Arguelles also used the artwork of Filipino artists like Galo Ocampo and Manansala to enhance the clean, spacious and brightly lit interiors.

The banding of the aluminium imbued the building with its extraordinary look. This horizontal definition countered the bulk and height of the building, allowing it to blend with the design context of the low-rise district of Manila.

The building was best known for its auditorium, whose acoustical profile is highly suitable for classical music. Known for its excellent acoustics, the Philam Life Theater is a 780-seat theater whose acoustics were done by Bolt, Beranek and Newman. It was considered a model of sorts for the rest of the other Philam Life buildings in terms of design.

Current Status 
In 2013, Philam Life has moved its headquarters to Bonifacio Global City in Taguig and has sold the Ermita site to mall developer SM Development Corp. (SMDC). Although many expect the site to be turned into a shopping mall, SMDC hasn't actually decided what to do with the Auditorium.

On August 5, 2020, its Ermita site has started its demolition process amid the COVID-19 pandemic.

Makati Office 
The company also owns the 14th tallest building in the Philippines, the Philamlife Tower along Paseo de Roxas Avenue in Makati through its real estate affiliate. The building was inaugurated in 2000. It is also served as the AIA Philippines headquarters since 2023.

References

External links 
 Official Website

American International Group
Financial services companies established in 1947
Companies based in Bonifacio Global City
Life insurance companies of the Philippines
Philippine companies established in 1947